This list classifies all of the works of Charlotte Mary Yonge, a prolific British novelist.

Information is taken from the Oxford Dictionary of National Biography and the British Library catalogue.

Novels

 —. Château de Melville, 1838 (privately distributed)
 —. Abbeychurch, or, Self Control and Self Conceit. London: James Burns, 1844.
 —. Scenes and Characters, or, Eighteen Months at Beechcroft. London: James Burns, 1847.
 —. The Railroad Children, 1849. 
 —. Henrietta's Wish, or, Domineering: A Tale 1850. 
 —. Kenneth, or, The Rear Guard of the Grand Army, 1850. 
 —. Langley School, 1850. 
 —. The Heir of Redclyffe. 2 vols. London: John W. Parker & Son, 1853.
 —. The Herb of the Field, 1853. 
 —. The Castle Builders, or, The Deferred Confirmation. London: J. & C. Mozley, 1854.
 —. Heartsease, or, The Brother's Wife, 1854. 
 —. The Little Duke, or, Richard the Fearless, 1854. 
 —. The Lances of Lynwood, 1855.
 —. The History of Sir Thomas Thumb, Edinburgh: Thomas Constable & Co., 1855.
 —. The Daisy Chain, or, Aspirations. London: John W. Parker & Son, 1856.
 —. Ben Sylvester's Word, 1856. 
 —. Dynevor Terrace. 2 vols. London: John W. Parker and Son, 1857.
 —. Friarswood Post Office, 1860. 
 —. Hopes and Fears, or, Scenes from the life of a Spinster, 1860. 
 —. The Pigeon Pie, 1860. 
 —. The Young Stepmother. London: Macmillan, 1861.
 —. Countess Kate. London: J. & C. Mozley, 1862.
 —. The Trial, or, More Links of the Daisy Chain, 1864. 
 —. The Clever Woman of the Family. 2 vols. London and Cambridge: Macmillan, 1865.
 —. The Dove in the Eagle's Nest, 1866. 
 —. The Prince and the Page; A Story of the Last Crusade, 1866. 
 —. The Six Cushions, 1867. 
 —. The Chaplet of Pearls, or, The White and Black Ribaumont. London: Macmillan, 1868.
 —. The Caged Lion. London: Macmillan, 1870.
 —. Little Lucy's Wonderful Globe, 1871. 
 —. Dames of High Estate, 1872. 
 —. The Pillars of the House, 1874. 
 —. Lady Hester, or, Ursula's Narrative, 1874. 
 —. The Three Brides, 1876. 
 —. Magnum Bonum, 1879.
 —. Cheap Jack. London: Walter Smith, 1881.
 —. Stray Pearls: Memoirs of Margaret de Ribaumont, Viscountess of Bellaise. London: Walter Smith, 1881-3.
 —. The Armourer's Prentices. 2 vols. London: Macmillan, 1884.
 —. The Two Sides of the Shield. 2 vols. London: Macmillan, 1885.
 —. Chantry House. 2 vols. London: Macmillan, 1886.
 —. A Modern Telemachus. 2 vols. London: Macmillan, 1886.
 —. Beechcroft at Rockstone. 2 vols. London: Macmillan, 1888.
 —. Our New Mistress, or Changes at Brookfield Earl. London: National Society's Depository, 1888.
 —. A Reputed Changeling, or, Three Seventh Years Two Centuries Ago. 2 vols. London: Macmillan, 1889.
 —. The Cunning Woman's Grandson; a Tale of Cheddar a hundred years ago. London: National Society's Depository, 1890.
 —. The Slaves of Sabinus, Jew and Gentile. London: National Society's Depository, 1890.
 —. An Old Woman's Outlook. London: Macmillan, 1892
 —. The Cook and the Captive, or Attalus the Hostage. London: National Society's Depository, 1895.
 —. The Carbonels. London: National Society's Depository, 1896.
 —. The Patriots of Palestine, a Story of the Maccabees. London: National Society's Depository, 1899.
 —. Modern Broods, or, Developments Unlooked For. London: Macmillan, 1900.

Plays

 —. The Apple of Discord. London: Groombridge and Sons, 1864.

Anthologies

 —. Aunt Charlotte's Evenings at Home With the Poets. A collection of poems for the Young, with conversations, arranged in twenty five evenings, etc. London: Marcus Ward, 1880.

Story collections

 —. The Christmas Mummers and other stories. London: J. & C. Mozley, 1858.  Contains The Christmas Mummers, The Rail-Road Children, Leonard, the Lion-Hearted, Ben Sylvester's Word, Midsummer Day; or, The Two Churches, Harriet and Her Sister, and London Pride.
 —. A Book of Golden Deeds of All Times and All Lands. London: Macmillan, 1864.
 —. A Book of Worthies gathered from the old histories and now written anew by the author of The Heir of Redclyffe. London: Macmillan, 1869.
 —. Aunt Charlotte's Stories of Bible History for the little ones. London: n.p., 1873.
 —. Aunt Charlotte's Stories of English History for the Little ones. London, Marcus Ward, 1873.
 —. Aunt Charlotte's Stories of Greek History for the little ones. London: n.p., 1876.
 —. Aunt Charlotte's Stories of Roman History for the little ones. London: n.p., 1877.
 —. Aunt Charlotte's Stories of German History for the little ones. London: Marcus Ward, 1878.
 —. Bye-Words. A Collection of tales new and old. London: Macmillan, 1880.
 —. Aunt Charlotte's Stories of American History. London: Marcus Ward, 1883.
 —. Aunt Charlotte's Stories of French History for the little ones. London: Marcus Ward, 1893.

Biographies

 —. Hannah More.
 —. Life of John Coleridge Patteson

Co-authored works

 —, Mary Bramston, Christabel Rose Coleridge, and Esmé Stuart. Astray: A Tale of a Country Town. London: Hatchards, 1886.

Works edited

 —, ed. Biographies of Good Women, chiefly by contributors to The Monthly Packet. Edited by the author of The Heir of Redclyffe. 2nd series. London: J. & C. Mozley, 1862.
 —, ed. A Storehouse of Stories.London: Macmillan, 1870.
 —, ed. Charity. Scripture texts and sacred songs. London: Griffith & Farran, 1884.
 Du Boys, Albert. Catherine of Aragon and the Sources of the English Reformation. Edited from the French, with notes, by C. M. Yonge. 2 vols. London: Hurst & Blackett, 1881.
 Wilford, Florence. Beneath the Cross: readings for children on Our Lord's Seven sayings. Ed. by Charlotte M. Yonge. With a preface by ... R. F. Wilson. London: Masters and Co., 1881.
 John Keble 's Parishes – A History of Hursley and Otterbourne. (1898)

Other works

 —. The Story of the Christians and Moors of Spain, London: MacMillan, 1878.
 —. Cameos from English History. 7 vols. London: Macmillan, 1880-1890.
 —. Burnt out: a story for mothers' meetings. London: n.p., 1882.
 —. A Story of Mission Work in China. 1900.
 —. History of Christian Names 1863 (per her original Preface); Macmillan and Co., London, 1884; republished by Gale Research Co., Book Tower, Detroit, 1966.
 —. Young Folks' History of Rome. Boston: Estes & Lauriat, 1880.

Notes

External links

 Jay, Elisabeth. "Yonge, Charlotte Mary." Oxford Dictionary of National Biography''. Oxford: Oxford University Press, 2004. Retrieved on 8 May 2009.

Yonge, Charlotte Mary
Bibliographies of British writers
Children's literature bibliographies